The term switching station may refer to:

 an electrical substation, with only one voltage level, whose only function are switching actions.
 a battery switch station, such as the ones used by the Better Place network.
 a railroad switching station.
 a telephone switching station.